Iván Francisco Villazón Aponte (born October 25, 1959 in the city of Valledupar, Colombia), is one of the most renowned vallenato singers in Colombia. His career as a singer began in 1984 after dropping out of college where he was pursuing a degree in law.

Early life 
Villazon spent his childhood in the city Valledupar where he attended middle school in the Colegio María Montessori.  He grew up loving "parrandas" (parties) that his father Crispin organized with local musicians like Colacho Mendoza, Adán Montero, Ovidio Granados, Rodolfo Castilla and Alejo Duran, among many others.  For high school Villazon was sent to the city of Bogotá to study in the Colegio REFOUS.  After graduation he spent four years in college studying law in the Externado University but dropped out to pursue a vallenato singing career.

Singing career
In 1984 Villazon recorded his first album with accordion player Alfredo Gámez under the Philips Records label and named it the Arco Iris (Rainbow) featuring a song of the same name written by Rafael Escalona. The album was a success and the song is still considered his trademark.

In 1985 he teamed up with accordion player Orangel Maestre and released a new album under the same record label with the name Una Voz, Un Rey. Three songs from this album became major hits: Mella Condolete by composer Hernando Marin, Pedazo de Acordeon by Alejo Duran and Sufrir de nuevo by van Ovalle.

In 1986 Villazon joined with accordion player Raul Martinez to record two albums, Los Virtuosos and Vamo' Amanece, under the CBS record label (now Columbia Records). The award-winning song El amor es un cultivo recorded in this album became a major hit, along with Sed de alma and Matica de toronjil. In 1987 they recorded their third album named Los Virtuosos Volumen II, producing two major hits; Recuérdame written by singer and composer Gustavo Gutiérrez Cabello and Yo tenia un amigo written by composer Rafael Manjarrez. Personal differences arose between Villazon and Martinez and they decided to separate.

In 1988 Villazon teamed up with accordion player and Vallenato Legend Festival winner Cocha molina who had been the partner of Diomedes Diaz. They recorded the album Por ti Valledupar from which they produced three major hits; No espero mas by composer Efren Calderon, Que siga la fiesta by José Alfonso Maestre and Por ti Valledupar of Gustavo Gutierrez, under the CBS record label. In 1989 they recorded their second album together named Enamorado de ella with hit songs Mis Condiciones by Gustavo Gutierrez and Enamorado de ella by Rafael Manjarrez. In 1990 they recorded their third album under the CBS record label titled El Amor Canta Vallenato with the hit songs Mi novia querida by Gustavo Gutierrez, El Amor Canta Vallenato by Ignasio Urbina and Volá pajarito by Alejo Duran.

This same year Villazon and Molina decided to go their different ways and Villazon teamed up with accordion player Beto Villa to record the album La Compañía under the recording label EMI. This album represents his most successful album because all of the album's songs became major hits on radio, including El Perdón, El Niño Bonito, La Suegra, El Guayabito and La Fuerza del Amor. After this successful production Villazon and Beto Villa split and Villazon took two years off from the stage and recording studios.

In 1993 Villazon worked with accordion player Franco Arguelles and recorded the album Mar de Lagrimas on the Colombian record label CODISCOS, with the hit songs Quereme by Juancho Rois, Cuando hablo de Tí by Iván Ovalle and a musical mosaic honoring Pacho Galán. In 1994, they recorded their second album together named Noticias, producing successful songs like Decídete by Fabián Corrales, Noticias by Efraín Barliza and Acabaste con mí Vida by Juancho Rois. This year the group won the Congo de Oro prize in the Barranquilla's Carnival, the Sirena de Oro in the Vallenato Legend Festival and the Super Estrella Internacional de Oro song of the year for the song Decídete by Fabian Corrales. The group also achieved prominence internationally in locations where vallenato is not part of the mainstream, like Cuba, Canada and Aruba. In 1996 Villazon and Arguelles recorded the album Sin Limites under the record label CODISCOS in which a fusion with other musical genres was tried with songs like Almas Felices by Alfonso Cotes Maya, La Pelionera by Emiliano Zuleta and Cuando muera esta ilusión by Luis Egurrola.  This collaboration was not widely successful. They later changed record labels to BMG Ariola of Colombia, recording the album Entrégate with songs like No te ruego más by Jorge Valbuena, Entrégate by Fabián Corrales, Yo la Ví by Jacobo Ibarra and Marcos Torres, and Corazón Sensible by Franco Arguelles. This album earned a Disco de Oro for its sales and a second Congo de Oro. In 1999 Villazon and Arguelles released the albums Tiempo de Vallenato and later Detalles.

In 2000 Arguelles left the group to record an album with Diomedes Diaz. Villazon partnered with Saul Lallemand producing the following albums; El Mundo al Reves, Amores, Juglares Legendarios I, Póngale la Firma, El Desafío, El Gallo Fino, El Poder del Amor and El Aviador.

Discography

Albums:
 El Arco Iris – 1984
 Una voz un rey – 1985
 Vamo' amanecé – 1986
 Los Virtuosos – 1987
 Por Ti Valledupar – 1988
 Enamorado de Ella – 1989
 El Amor Canta Vallenato – 1990
 La Compañía – 1991
 Mar de Lágrimas – 1993
 Noticia – 1994
 Sin Límites – 1995 	
 Entrégate – 1996
 Tiempo de Vallenato – 1997
 Detalles – 1998
 El Mundo al Revés – 1999
 Amores – 2000
 Juglares Legendarios Vol 1 – 2001
 Póngale la Firma – 2002
 El Desafío – 2002
 El Gallo Fino – 2003
 El Poder del Amor – 2004
 El Sueño de mi vida – 2005
 El Aviador – 2006
 23 Años de Grandes Exitos-Su Trayectoria [2007]
 Pa' que te enamores [2008] Iván Zuleta
 El Vallenato Mayor [2009] José María Chema Ramos

Family
Villazon is the son of Crispín Villazón de Armas y Clara Aponte López. He married Aida Mercedes García Tolosa and has three children: Crispin Enrique, Iván David and Daniel Camilo.
Lucas Francisco, Carolina and Francisco Villazon are Ivan's brother children.

Notes

External links
ElVallenato.com Ivan Villazon
lavallenata.com – Ivan Villazon
radiouno.com – Ivan Villazon

1959 births
Living people
Valledupar
20th-century Colombian male singers
Vallenato musicians
People from Cesar Department
21st-century Colombian male singers